Gakog (Hongyuan) County ( or) is a county in the north of Sichuan Province, China. It is under the administration of the Ngawa Tibetan and Qiang Autonomous Prefecture. There is a river called Ka Chu/Gaqu in the area and kog means "valley" or "area"; thus it means the area of the Ga River.

This is the only county under the Prefecture with entirely yak herding pastoralists. About 8,398 square meter and about 40,000 people reside (2004) mostly Amdo Tibetan. The language is spoken is one of the most conservative dialect among the Amdo Tibetan varieties. Khyungchu).

Southwest University for Nationalities maintains the Qinghai-Tibetan Plateau Ecological Environmental Protection and Advanced Technology for Animal Husbandry in Hongyuan County.

The country is served by Hongyuan Airport.

Climate

Administrative divisions
Hongyuan County  has 5 townships:
Townships:
Amuke
Kangle
Longri
Maiwa
Waqie

References

Ngawa Tibetan and Qiang Autonomous Prefecture
County-level divisions of Sichuan